Group B Strep Support is a national charity based in the United Kingdom.

History
Group B Strep Support was formed in 1996, after the founders' son had a group B Strep infection. Since then it has established a medical panel and set up a board of trustees. The charity has been heavily involved in public consultations on group B Strep prevention, and in 2012 commented on the National Screening Committee's review of GBS testing. In 2012, the chief executive Jane Plumb received an MBE for services for child health.

Aims
GBSS states that it has three main aims:
 Offer information and support to families affected by group B Streptococcus
 Inform health professionals and individuals how most group B Strep infections in newborn babies can be prevented
 Generate continued support for research into preventing group B Strep infections in newborn babies

Key achievements
Worked with UK health professionals and professional medical bodies to raise the profile of group B Strep in the UK.
Played a part in causing the 2003 RCOG risk-based guidelines on the prevention of early-onset group B Strep infection, and continues to campaign for improved guidelines and awareness in medical professionals.
Raised significant public awareness of group B Strep and the impact a group B Strep infection can have on newborn babies if not prevented.

Notable supporters
Alasdair McDonnell
David Cameron
Hilary Jones (doctor)
James Roby
Jeffrey Donaldson
Kate Garraway
Nadine Dorries
Nicholas Soames
Philip Hollobone
Theresa May

Patron
Chris Steele
James Roby
Nicholas Soames

References

External links

Health charities in the United Kingdom
Health issues in pregnancy
Organizations established in 1996